Sheberghān or Shaburghān (Uzbek, Pashto), also spelled Shebirghan and Shibarghan, is the capital city of the Jowzjan Province in northern Afghanistan.

The city of Sheberghan has a population of 175,599. It has four districts and a total land area of 7,335 hectares. The total number of dwellings in Sheberghān is 19,511.

In 2021, the Taliban gained control of the city during the 2021 Taliban offensive.

Location

Sheberghān airport is situated between Sheberghān and Aqcha.

Etymology

The city's name is a corruption of its classical Persian name, Shaporgân, meaning "[King] Shapur's town". Shapur was the name of two Sasanian kings, both of whom built a great number of cities. However, Shapur I was the governor of the eastern provinces of the empire, and it is more likely that he is the builder of a roadway between a few important cities. These include Nishapur and Bishapur in Iran, and Peshawar in Pakistan.

Ethnography

After Maymana, Sheberghan is the second most important Uzbek and Turkmen-dominated city in all of Afghanistan. Turkmen is the first language of a majority of its inhabitants. Large numbers of Tajiks, Hazaras, Pashtuns, and Arabs live in the city. In 1856, J. P. Ferrier wrote: "Sheberghān is a town containing 12,000 souls. Uzbeks being in the great majority." According to regional consensus of the afghan government as of 2020 Turkmens made up majority of the inhabitants.  

The Sheberghan "Arabs" are all Persian-speaking, even though they claim an Arab identity. There are other such Persian and Pashto-speaking "Arabs" to the east, with pockets residing in Mazar-i Sharif, Kholm, Kunduz, and Jalalabad. Their self-identification as Arabs is largely based on their tribal identity, and may in fact point to the Arab migration of the 7th and 8th centuries migration to this and other Central Asian locales in the wake of the Islamic conquests of the region.

History

Sheberghān was once a flourishing settlement along the Silk Road. In 1978, Soviet archaeologists discovered the famed Bactrian Gold in the village of Tillia Tepe outside Sheberghān. In the 13th century Marco Polo visited the city and later wrote about its honey-sweet melons. Sheberghān became the capital of an independent Uzbek khanate that was allotted to Afghanistan by the 1873 Anglo-Russian border agreement.

Sheberghān has for millennia been the focal point of power in the northeast corner of Bactria. It still sits astride the main route between Balkh and Herat, and controls the direct route north to the Amu Darya, about 90 km away, as well as the important branch route south to Sar-e Pol.
 
In 1856, J. P. Ferrier reported:

In 1977, a Soviet-Afghan archaeological team began excavations 5 km north of the town for relics. They uncovered mud-brick columns and a cross-shaped altar of an ancient temple dating back to at least 1000 B.C. Six royal tombs were excavated at Tillia Tepe revealing a vast amount of gold and other treasures. Several coins dated to the early 1st century C.E., with none dated later.

Sheberghān has been proposed as the site of ancient Xidun, one of the five xihou, or divisions, of the early Kushan Empire.

Sheberghān was the stronghold of local Uzbek warlord Abdul Rashid Dostum while vying with his Tajik rival General Mohammed Atta for control of northern Afghanistan in the early years of the Karzai administration.

Sheberghān was the site of the Dasht-i-Leili massacre in December 2001 during the U.S. invasion of Afghanistan in which 250 to 3,000 (depending on sources) Taliban prisoners were shot or suffocated to death in metal truck containers, while being transferred by American and Northern Alliance soldiers from Kunduz to a Sheberghān prison.  

On 7 August 2021, Taliban forces captured Sheberghan as part of their nationwide military offensive.

Land use
Sheberghān is a trading and transit hub in northern Afghanistan. Agriculture accounts for 50% of the 7,335 hectares within the municipal boundaries. 23% of the land is residential, and largely clustered in the central area, but well distributed through the four districts.

Climate
Sheberghān has a cool, semi-arid climate (Köppen climate classification BSk) with hot summers and chilly, though variable, winters. There is moderate rainfall and some snowfall from January to March, but the rest of the year is dry, especially the summer.

Economy
Sheberghān is surrounded by irrigated agricultural land.

With Soviet assistance, exploitation of Afghanistan's natural gas reserves began in 1967 at the Khowaja Gogerak field, 15 kilometers east of Sheberghān in Jowzjan Province. The field's reserves were thought to be 67 billion cubic meters. In 1967, the Soviets also completed a 100-kilometer gas pipeline linking Keleft in the Soviet Union with Sheberghān.

To demonstrate how natural gas reserves could be used as an alternative to expensive petroleum imports, the United States Department of Defense spent $43 million on a natural gas filling station.

Sheberghān is important to the energy infrastructure of Afghanistan:

 The Zomrad Sai Oilfield is situated near Sheberghān.
 The Sheberghān Topping Plant processes crude oil for consumption in heating boilers in Kabul, Mazari Sharif, and Sheberghān.
 The Jorqaduk, Khowaja Gogerak, and Yatimtaq gas fields are all located within  of Sheberghān.

See also

Dasht-i-Leili massacre

Footnotes

References
 Barfield, Thomas J. (1982). The Central Asian Arabs of Afghanistan: Pastoral Nomadism in Transition.
 Dupree, Nancy Hatch. (1977). An Historical Guide to Afghanistan. 1st Edition: 1970. 2nd Edition (1977). Revised and Enlarged. Afghan Tourist Organization, 1977. Chapter 21 "Maimana to Mazar-i-Sharif."
 Ferrier, J. P. (1856), Caravan Journeys and Wanderings in Persia, Afghanistan, Turkistan and Beloochistan. John Murray, London.
 Hill, John E. (2009). Through the Jade Gate to Rome: A Study of the Silk Routes during the Later Han Dynasty, 1st to 2nd Centuries CE. BookSurge, Charleston, South Carolina. .
 Leriche, Pierre. (2007). "Bactria: Land of a Thousand Cities." In: After Alexander: Central Asia before Islam. Eds. Georgina Hermann and Joe Cribb. (2007). Proceedings of the British Academy 133. Oxford University Press.
 Sarianidi, Victor. (1985). The Golden Hoard of Bactria: From the Tillya-tepe Excavations in Northern Afghanistan. Harry N. Abrams, New York.

External links
 Map of Sheberghān

Jowzjan Province
Populated places along the Silk Road
Cities in Afghanistan
Provincial capitals in Afghanistan
Populated places with period of establishment missing